Spacetoon TV ( or ) is a pan-Arab free-to-air television channel that specializes in animation and children programs. It began broadcasting on 15 March 2000 and it is headquartered in Dubai, UAE with offices in Riyadh. The channel targets children from 4 and up. Its late night block Space Power is targeted at teenagers and young adults. The Spacetoon company also maintains a video-on-demand app called Spacetoon Go. 

The Spacetoon company has had two now-defunct channels in the Arab world, Space Power TV and Spacetoon English. 

The main Indonesian channel began airing on 24 March 2005 in Jakarta. It later became NET., and its broadcast remains on satellite television. Currently, there are three Spacetoon channels in Indonesia: Spacetoon, Space Shopping and Spacetoon Plus. In India, Spacetoon India exists as licensing company, but not as a separate TV channel. In South Korea, Spacetoon launched in 2005 but has since closed down.
Spacetoon is currently broadcast in 22 countries, and has an audience of over 130million viewers.

History

Arab world
In 1999, Bahrain Radio and Television Corporation officially signed an agreement to broadcast a children's cartoon channel. On 15 March 2000, Spacetoon officially launched, but as a seven-hour block. Spacetoon continued to air this way until the contract ended on 12 January 2002, according to a statement issued by the Ministry. Later, in 2004, Spacetoon moved its headquarters to Dubai and was established as an independent channel on Nilesat running 24/7.

In the Arab world, the majority of programs are dubbed in modern standard Arabic. Spacetoon is closely affiliated with Venus Center, a Syrian dubbing company which has historically provided the Arabic dubbed versions of the programming. Using modern standard Arabic in dubbing played a crucial role in maintaining the use of the dialect in childhood, which was especially significant given the context of emerging spoken Arabic dialects.

Indonesia
In Indonesia, Spacetoon officially launched on 24 March 2005. The network was founded by H. Sukoyo, co-founder of TV7. When it was launched, Spacetoon broadcast from 6 a.m. to 9:30 p.m. WIB. Later, broadcast timings were extended from 5 a.m. to 11 p.m.  When programming ended, a 10-minute section filled with animation, songs, or messages for children was shown. During mid-2011, due to financial problems, Spacetoon began broadcasting some home-shopping programs and alternative medicine programs.

In March 2013, 95% of Spacetoon ownership stakes were acquired by Net Visi Media. On 18 May 2013, Spacetoon officially closed for terrestrial to make way for NET. on terrestrial network, while Spacetoon broadcast in Indonesia still remains on satellite television.
In September 2014, Spacetoon split into two channels: Spacetoon and Spacetoon 2. Spacetoon 2 broadcast more cartoon and animation than Spacetoon, although it still broadcast some home-shopping programs. In May 2016, Spacetoon added another channel, Spacetoon 3. It had clearer audio than Spacetoon and Spacetoon 2, but was closed down on October of the same year. In November 2016, Spacetoon 2 was renamed as Space Shopping due to the home shopping programmes contributing the most revenue to the channel, which overall had little income.
Currently, Spacetoon has three channels in Indonesia: Spacetoon, Space Shopping, and Spacetoon Plus.

Programming

Planets
Each of the programs aired were divided in blocks, called "planets", one for each genre:

  (planet of excitement and mystery) for action series. (such as Dragon Ball Z Kai, Iron Kid)
   (planet of challenge and strength) for sports series and programs. (such as Inazuma Eleven Ares)
   (planet of imagination and thrill) for adventure series. (such as Future Boy Conan, One Piece)
  (planet of laughter) for comedy series. (such as The Fairly OddParents, The New Woody Woodpecker Show, The Tom and Jerry Show, The Pink Panther)
  (planet of all colors) for animated movies.
   (planet of numbers and letters) for educational programs. (such as Pocoyo)
   (planet of heroes and adults) for preschool programs. (such as Fireman Sam, Bob the Builder, Thomas & Friends, The Care Bears Family)
   (planet of time immemorial) (former, 2000–2013) for the historical series. (such as Liberty's Kids)
   (planet of discovery and knowledge) for educational science programs. (such as Inspector Gadget's Field Trip, Secret Millionaires Club, Operation Ouch!)
  (means "emerald" in Arabic, planet just for girls) for series and programs for girls. (such as True and the Rainbow Kingdom, My Little Pony: Pony Life)

Censorship 
Programs aired on Spacetoon sometimes have aspects that are censored from their source material. In particular, scenes can be cropped or truncated in order to avoid showing excessive violence to viewers. This has been seen in programs such as Detective Conan, Romeo's Blue Skies, and Hunter × Hunter. Hunter × Hunter was also subject to the censorship of the depiction of Zen Buddhism and Taoism as related to the characters' powers, with the censored version opting to present their powers as a science and martial art. Selective cropping and editing are also used to hide cleavages and remove innuendo.

See also 
 Animation International
 Game Power 7, game publisher owned by Spacetoon
Spacetoon Go

References

Sources

External links 
 Spacetoon Arabic website
 
 
 
  (Spacetoon Arabic page)
  (Spacetoon Indonesia page)
 Spacetoon Indonesia website

 
Mass media companies of the United Arab Emirates
Arabic-language television stations
Children's television networks
Television channels and stations established in 2000
2003 establishments in the United Arab Emirates
Anime companies
Preschool education television networks